Etan (or Eitan, Eytan in Hebrew) is a male given name meaning steadfast, strong, firm, and safe, and may also refer to:

People
 Etan Boritzer (born 1950), American author
 Etan Cohen (born 1974), American screenwriter
 Etan Frankel, American playwright, television writer, and producer
 Etan Ilfeld, British entrepreneur
 Etan Mintz, American rabbi, activist, and writer
 Etan Patz (1972–unknown; legally dead 2001), American disappeared person
 Etan Thomas (born 1978), American basketball player

Other uses
 Etan, Iran, a village in Qazvin Province
 ETAN, the acronym of the East Timor and Indonesia Action Network

See also
 Eitan (disambiguation)
 Ethan (disambiguation)
 Ethen (disambiguation)

Modern names of Hebrew origin